Kentucky Route 1931 (KY 1931) is a  state highway in the U.S. State of Kentucky. Its southern terminus is at KY 1230 in Louisville and its northern terminus is at KY 2054 in Louisville.

Major junctions

References

1931
Transportation in Louisville, Kentucky